Shipbreaker may refer to: 

 Hardspace: Shipbreaker, an action-adventure simulation video game developed by Blackbird Interactive
 Ship Breaker, a 2010 young adult novel by Paolo Bacigalupi set in a post-apocalyptic future
 Ship breaking, a type of ship disposal involving the breaking up of ships for either a source of parts
 Shipbreakers, a 2004 documentary film